Maine's 4th congressional district was a congressional district in Maine. It was created in 1821 after Maine achieved statehood in 1820 due to the result of the ratification of the Missouri Compromise.  It was eliminated in 1933 after the 1930 U.S. Census.  Its last congressman was Donald F. Snow.

List of members representing the district

References

 Congressional Biographical Directory of the United States 1774–present

04
Former congressional districts of the United States
Constituencies established in 1821
1821 establishments in Maine
Constituencies disestablished in 1883
1883 disestablishments in Maine
Constituencies established in 1885
1885 establishments in Maine
Constituencies disestablished in 1933
1933 disestablishments in Maine